The William J. Jameson Law Library is the library of the Alexander Blewett III School of Law at the University of Montana in Missoula.

References

Law libraries in the United States